Tanintharyi may refer to:

 Tanintharyi or Taninthayi (known during the British occupation as Tenasserim), a town in Tanintharyi Township, Myeik District, in the Tanintharyi Region of Burma (Myanmar)
 Tanintharyi Region, formerly Tenasserim Division and Tanintharyi Division, an administrative region of Myanmar
 Tanintharyi Township, a township of Myeik District in the Tanintharyi Region of Myanmar

See also
Tenasserim (disambiguation)